The teams competing in Group 1 of the 2015 UEFA European Under-21 Championships qualifying competition were England, Finland, Lithuania, Moldova, San Marino and Wales.

The ten group winners and the four best second-placed teams advanced to the play-offs.

Standings

Results and fixtures
All times are CEST (UTC+02:00) during summer and CET (UTC+01:00) during winter.

Goalscorers
9 goals
  Saido Berahino

6 goals
  Tim Väyrynen

5 goals

  Harry Kane
  Igor Dima

4 goals
  Nicolae Milinceanu

3 goals

  Michael Keane
  Nathan Redmond
  Lukas Spalvis
  Tom Lawrence

2 goals

  Danny Ings
  Ravel Morrison
  Raheem Sterling
  James Ward-Prowse
  Moshtagh Yaghoubi
  Juri Biordi
  Wes Burns
  Lee Evans

1 goal

  Will Hughes
  Tom Ince
  Carl Jenkinson
  Kastriot Kastrati
  Daniel O'Shaughnessy
  Patrick O'Shaughnessy
  Joel Pohjanpalo
  Dani Hatakka
  Kimmo Hovi
  Thomas Lam
  Sauli Väisänen
  Gheorghe Anton
  Constantin Bogdan
  Ion Ursu
  Donatas Kazlauskas
  Edvardas Tamulevičius
  Ovidijus Verbickas
  Billy Bodin
  Gwion Edwards
  Ellis Harrison
  Emyr Huws
  Lee Lucas

References

External links
Standings and fixtures at UEFA.com

Group 1